Mariano Parada (born 30 May 1970) is an Argentine sailor. He competed in the Tornado event at the 2000 Summer Olympics.

References

External links
 

1970 births
Living people
Argentine male sailors (sport)
Olympic sailors of Argentina
Sailors at the 2000 Summer Olympics – Tornado
Place of birth missing (living people)
Lightning class world champions
Cadet class world champions
TP52 class world champions
World champions in sailing for Argentina
Snipe class world champions